Najmabad Rural District is in the Central District of Nazarabad County, Alborz province, Iran. At the census in 2006, the population was 8,880 in 2,178 households, at which time it was in Tankaman District of Nazarabad, then in Tehran province. At the most recent census of 2016, it had a population of 6,704 people in 1,983 households. The largest of its 18 villages was Sheykh Hasan, with 899 people.

References 

Nazarabad County

Rural Districts of Alborz Province

Populated places in Alborz Province

Populated places in Nazarabad County